Rufus King is an alternative rock band from Woodland, CA.  They wrote and performed the song, "Just What I Need", which is featured in the film Bring It On.

History

Rufus King formed in 1993 while they were still attending Woodland High School. Rufus King consists of Stephen Mott on vocals/guitar, Octavio Gallardo on bass, Scott Price on drums, and Jayla Siciliano on keys.

After graduating high school, the trio moved to Los Angeles in 1997 where they started playing gigs in local bars and clubs, such as Whisky a Go Go, Coconut Teaszer and Dragonfly.  In 1998, they were noticed by Loren Israel who later managed the act.

Rufus King disbanded during the summer of 2000.

Discography
 Morris Termination – 1995
 Anthar and his Many Band – 1996
 Que Onda – 1997
 More than a Lot – 2000

References 

Alternative rock groups from California
Musical groups established in 1993
Musical groups disestablished in 2000